Alan Emanuel Pierson (born May 12, 1974, Chicago, Illinois) is an American conductor.  His parents are Elaine Pierson and Edward S. Pierson, the latter an engineering professor at Purdue University Calumet. In Chicago Pierson took piano and composition lessons at the People's Music School, graduating high school at Francis W. Parker. Pierson is a 1996 graduate of the Massachusetts Institute of Technology with degrees in music and physics.  At MIT, he was a timpanist and an assistant conductor with the MIT Symphony Orchestra, and also a composer.

Pierson continued his studies in music at the Eastman School of Music, where he was a co-founder of the new music ensemble Ossia. Subsequently, he was a co-founder of the related new music ensemble Alarm Will Sound, which gave its first concert in 2001.  Pierson became the first music director of Alarm Will Sound in the same year, and continues to serve in the post.

In January 2011, Pierson was named the artistic director of the former Brooklyn Philharmonic. When the orchestra suspended operations in 2013 his contract was not renewed. Pierson also serves as principal conductor of the Crash Ensemble in Ireland, and has guest conducted with the Los Angeles Philharmonic, Chicago Symphony, Los Angeles Opera, New World Symphony, Orchestra of St. Luke's, Beth Morrison Projects, and  Symphoniker Hamburg.

Pierson has resided in New York City since 2002. He is currently on faculty at Northwestern University and conducts at Mannes College.

In February 2013 Pierson was featured on the Radiolab episode "Speedthoven"

References

External links
 Brooklyn Philharmonic artistic director biography
 Cantaloupe Music biography
 "Alarm Will Sound's Alan Pierson Named Artistic Director of Brooklyn Philharmonic".  Nonesuch Journal, 19 January 2011

1974 births
American male conductors (music)
Living people
MIT Department of Physics alumni
Eastman School of Music alumni
American LGBT musicians
LGBT classical musicians
LGBT people from Illinois
21st-century American conductors (music)
21st-century American male musicians
MIT School of Humanities, Arts, and Social Sciences alumni
21st-century LGBT people